Amateur rocketry, sometimes known as experimental rocketry or amateur experimental rocketry, is a hobby in which participants experiment with fuels and make their own rocket motors, launching a wide variety of types and sizes of rockets. Amateur rocketeers have been responsible for significant research into hybrid rocket motors, and have built and flown a variety of solid, liquid, and hybrid propellant motors.

History

Amateur rocketry was an especially popular hobby in the late 1950s and early 1960s following the launch of Sputnik, as described in Homer Hickam's 1998 memoir Rocket Boys.

One of the first organizations set up in the US to engage in amateur rocketry was the Pacific Rocket Society established in California in the early 1950s. The group did their research on rockets from a launch site deep in the Mojave Desert.

In the summer of 1956, 17-year-old Jimmy Blackmon of Charlotte, North Carolina, built a 6-foot rocket in his basement. The rocket was designed to be powered by combined liquid nitrogen, gasoline, and liquid oxygen. On learning that Blackmon wanted to launch his rocket from a nearby farm, the Civil Aeronautics Administration notified the U.S. Army. Blackmon's rocket was examined at Redstone Arsenal and eventually grounded on the basis that some of the material he had used was too weak to control the flow and mixing of the fuel.

Interest in the rocketry hobby was spurred to a great extent by the publication of a Scientific American article in June 1957 that described the design, propellant formulations, and launching techniques utilized by typical amateur rocketry groups of the time (including the Reaction Research Society of California). The subsequent publication, in 1960, of a book entitled Rocket Manual for Amateurs by Bertrand R. Brinley provided even more detailed information regarding the hobby, and further contributed to its burgeoning popularity.
 
At this time, amateur rockets nearly always employed either black powder, zinc-sulfur (also called "micrograin"), or rocket candy (often referred to as "caramel candy") propellant mixtures. However, such amateur rockets can be dangerous because noncommercial rocket motors may fail more often than commercial rocket motors if not correctly engineered. An appalling accident rate led individuals such as G. Harry Stine and Vernon Estes to make model rocketry a safe and widespread hobby by developing and publishing the National Association of Rocketry Model Rocket Safety Code, and by commercially producing safe, professionally designed and manufactured model rocket motors. Model rocketry by definition then became a separate and distinct activity from amateur rocketry.

As knowledge of modern advances in composite and liquid propellants became more available to the public, it became possible to develop amateur motors with greater safety.  Hobbyists were no longer dependent on dangerous packed-powder mixtures that could be delicate and unpredictable in handling and performance.

The Reaction Research Society conducts complex amateur rocket projects, utilizing solid, liquid, and hybrid propellant technologies. The Tripoli Rocketry Association sanctions some amateur activities, which they call "research rocketry," provided certain safety guidelines are followed, and provided the motors are of relatively standard design.

Projects such as Sugar Shot to Space attempt to launch rockets using "rocket candy" as a propellant.

Notable events

On May 17, 2004, Civilian Space eXploration Team (CSXT) successfully achieved the first officially verified flight of an amateur high-power rocket into space, achieving an altitude of 116 km (72 mi).

Prior to that, the Reaction Research Society on November 23, 1996, launched a solid-fuel rocket, designed by longtime member George Garboden, to an altitude of 80 km (50 mi) from the Black Rock Desert in Nevada.

For Series 9, Episode 4 of the BBC's Top Gear, a group of amateur rocketeers were given four and a half months to convert a Reliant Robin into a space shuttle with the assistance of an engineering firm. The shuttle used 6 x 40,960 N·s O hybrid motors for a maximum thrust of 8 metric tonnes, making it the most powerful non-governmental rocket launch in Europe. Unfortunately, the explosive bolts holding the Robin to the external tank failed to separate, causing it to crash into a nearby hill.

On 22 March 2007, Embry-Riddle Aeronautical University, Daytona Beach launched the two-staged Icarus rocket from NASA Wallops Flight Facility in Virginia. Icarus was designed and built by students from the Embry-Riddle Future Space Explorers and Developers Society. This vehicle set the world record for highest altitude launch by a student team with an apogee of 37.8 miles (200,000 feet), with a maximum velocity of Mach 4.04. It also became the first two-stage student sounding rocket to launch from a NASA facility.

On June 3, 2011, Copenhagen Suborbitals launched the HEAT 1X Tycho Brahe rocket with a capsule containing a test dummy. The flight had the wrong trajectory and had to be aborted in-flight (potentially the first in-flight termination of an amateur rocket based on telemetry data and radio command).

On June 23, 2013, Copenhagen Suborbitals launched the SAPPHIRE-1 rocket with active guidance. This rocket reached an altitude of 8.2 km with a horizontal error/drift of 180 m at apogee with respect to the launch platform. This launch was also a potential first in amateur rocketry as the first guided rocket launched by amateurs.

On October 16, 2015, Delft Aerospace Rocket Engineering (DARE) launched the Stratos II+ rocket from El Arenosillo, in Spain, to an altitude of 21.457 km with a successful water landing and capsule recovery. This broke the original amateur European altitude record of 12.3 km set by DARE in 2009 with the launch of Stratos I. This record stood as the European altitude record among all student rocketry programs.

On November 8, 2016, Hybrid Engine Development (HyEnD), a student team from the University of Stuttgart, Germany, launched the HEROS 3 (Hybrid Experimental ROcket Stuttgart) from Esrange Space Center in Northern Sweden to an altitude of above 30 km. By this, the European altitude record for student programs and the World record for hybrid propulsion student rockets was taken by HyEnD.

On April 21, 2019, USCRPL launched TRAVELER IV, an eight-inch diameter vehicle from Spaceport America. All of the subsystems were reported as successful, and the vehicle was fully recovered. On May 22, 2019, a whitepaper was published calculating apogee altitude of 339,800 ft ± 16,500, giving a 90% confidence that it passed the Kármán line. This makes it the highest-performing student-designed and student-manufactured rocket in the world, and the first to reach the internationally accepted definition of space. However, even though all subsystems were reported as performing nominally throughout the flight, the rocket experienced a loss of GPS data from approximately 13 seconds to 278 seconds of flight, therefore missing apogee.

On 3 August 2019, Cape Rocketry launched JR101 in the Karoo, South Africa. An altitude of 10.3 km was reached, making it the highest verified altitude achieved in Africa by an amateur group. This was an especially notable achievement as the propellant was based on Ammonium Nitrate, as opposed to the more common ammonium perchlorate. All major components used were manufactured in South Africa, including electronics and propellant.

On February 22, 2020 Mike Hughes, known as "Mad Mike", died after the parachute in his homemade rocket deployed prematurely and detached during liftoff.

On March 8, 2021, a student group of the South African University of KwaZulu-Natal beat the previous African amateur hybrid rocket altitude record with their "Phoenix-1B Mk IIr" vehicle by reaching 18 km height after successfully launching it at the Denel Overberg Test Range in the Western Cape.

See also
Amateur rocket motor classification
Civilian Space eXploration Team
Copenhagen Suborbitals
Delft Aerospace Rocket Engineering
Elon Musk
Friends of Amateur Rocketry
High-power rocket
Model rocket
Reaction Research Society
Rocketry Organization of California
Rocket candy
Rocket Festival
Space Frontier Foundation
Thermalite
Volksrocket Robert Truax

References

External links

Build Your Own Radio Beacon Rocket Tracker
Reaction Research Society (RRS)
Rocketry Online
European Model Rocketry
Richard Nakka's Experimental Rocketry Web Site
Steve Jurvetson's TED Talk on Amateur Rocketry
I Build Rockets Website
Argentinean Amateur Rocketry Association
Altus Metrum Free hardware and software for rocketry
Apogee Rockets
National Association of Rocketry
UK Rocketry Association
British Model Flying Association
The Rocket Range - UK Space News and Model Rocketry
Fins Over Gwent Rocketry Club

 

Rocketry